In control theory, we may need to find out whether or not a system such as

One of the many ways one can achieve such goal is by the use of the Observability Gramian.

Observability in LTI Systems

One can determine if the LTI system is or is not observable simply by looking at the pair . Then, we can say that the following statements are equivalent:

1. The pair  is observable.

2. The  matrix

is nonsingular for any .

3. The  observability matrix

has rank n.

4. The  matrix

If, in addition, all eigenvalues of  have negative real parts ( is stable) and the unique solution of

is positive definite, then the system is observable. The solution is called the Observability Gramian and can be expressed as

In the following section we are going to take a closer look at the Observability Gramian.

Observability Gramian 

The Observability Gramian can be found as the solution of the Lyapunov equation given by

In fact, we can see that if we take

as a solution, we are going to find that:

This shows us that  is indeed the solution for the Lyapunov equation under analysis.

Properties 

We can use again the fact that, if  is stable (all its eigenvalues have negative real part) to show that  is unique. In order to prove so, suppose we have two different solutions for

Then we have:

using the fact that  as :

In other words,  has to be unique.

Also, we can see that

is positive for any  (assuming the non-degenerate case where  is not identically zero), and that makes  a positive definite matrix.

More properties of observable systems can be found in, as well as the proof for the other equivalent statements of "The pair  is observable" presented in section Observability in LTI Systems.

Discrete Time Systems 

For discrete time systems as

One can check that there are equivalences for the statement "The pair  is observable" (the equivalences are much alike for the continuous time case).

is positive definite and given by

That is called the discrete Observability Gramian. More properties and proofs can be found in.

Linear Time Variant Systems 

Linear time variant (LTV) systems are those in the form:

That is, the matrices ,  and  have entries that varies with time. Again, as well as in the continuous time case and in the discrete time case, one may be interested in discovering if the system given by the pair  is observable or not. This can be done in a very similar way of the preceding cases.

The system  is observable at time  if and only if there exists a finite  such that the  matrix also called the Observability Gramian is given by

Again, we have a similar method to determine if a system is or not an observable system.

Properties of 

We have that the Observability Gramian  have the following property:

More about the Observability Gramian can be found in.

See also
Observability
Controllability Gramian
Gramian matrix
Hankel singular value

References

External links
Mathematica function to compute the observability Gramian

Control theory